Zildjian leads here. For people with the surname, see Zildjian (disambiguation)

The Avedis Zildjian Company, simply known as Zildjian, is a musical instrument manufacturer specializing in cymbals and other percussion instruments. Founded by the ethnic Armenian Zildjian family in the 17th-century Ottoman Empire, the company relocated to the United States in the 20th century. Today, it is the largest cymbal and drumstick maker in the world.

The company was founded in Constantinople in 1623 by Avedis Zildjian, an Armenian. Zildjian is now based in Norwell, Massachusetts. Zildjian is the oldest manufacturer of musical instruments in the world as well as one of the oldest continuously operating companies in the world.  Zildjian sells cymbals, drumsticks, percussion mallets and other drum accessories under the Zildjian, Vic Firth and Balter Mallet brands.

History

Beginnings

The first Zildjian cymbals were created in 1618 by Avedis Zildjian, an Armenian metalsmith and alchemist. Like his father, who was also a metalsmith, he worked for the court of the Sultan of the Ottoman Empire in Constantinople. He made an alloy of tin, copper, and silver into a sheet of metal, which could make musical sounds without shattering. Sultan Mustafa I gave Avedis eighty gold pieces as a bequest, in addition to officially recognizing the surname Zilciyan or Zildjian, meaning "Son of a Cymbal Maker" or "Family of Cymbalsmiths" in Armenian (with zil being Turkish for "cymbal", ci meaning "maker", and ian being the Armenian suffix meaning "son of"). In 1623 the Sultan granted him permission to leave the palace to start his own business in the Armenian sector of Constantinople, called Psamatia.

Zildjian's shop manufactured cymbals for the mehter, Ottoman military bands consisting of wind and percussion instruments, which belonged to the Janissaries. Mehter ensembles, which were known in the West primarily for playing in battle, also performed courtly music for Ottoman rulers. The Zildjians also produced instruments for Greek and Armenian churches, Sufi dervishes, and belly dancers of the Ottoman harem, who wore finger cymbals.

After the death of Avedis, the business, and the secret for producing the metal, was handed down to several generations of male heirs. In the early 19th century, Haroutune Zildjian passed it on to his son Avedis II. In 1850, Avedis II built a 25-foot schooner, in order to sail cymbals produced in Constantinople to trade exhibitions such as the Great Exhibition in London, and to supply musicians in Europe. He died in 1865, and since his sons were too young, his brother Kerope II took over the company. He introduced a line of instruments called K Zildjian, which are used by classical musicians to this day. Kerope II died in 1909 in Constantinople.

20th century

Following Kerope’s death, the business returned to Avedis’s side of the family. The eldest, Haroutune II, had become a lawyer and held a high position in the Ottoman government, thus he was not interested, and being a bachelor, he passed it to Aram. He was involved in the Armenian nationalist movement and resistance to the atrocities of the ruling Sultan, Abdul Hamid II. This was a time of political upheaval when the Ottoman Empire was in decline. Abdul Hamid II, also known as the ‘Bloody Sultan’ for his massacres of up to 300,000 Armenians in the mid-1890s, had reasserted Pan-Islamism.  Before Sultan Abdul Hamid II was finally deposed, there were several attempts to assassinate him. After being implicated in a 1905 failed plot to assassinate the Sultan, Aram fled to Bucharest, where he set up a small foundry.

During Aram's exile, Kerope II's daughter Victoria oversaw the Constantinople factory. There are conflicting accounts, but it is thought that Aram returned there in 1926.

Haroutune II's son Avedis III had left Turkey for the United States in 1909, and settled in Boston, where he established a family and a confectionary business. In 1927, he received a letter from his uncle Aram, informing him that he was to become heir to the family business, and Aram came to the US. In 1928, Avedis III, his brother Puzant, and his uncle Aram Zildjian began manufacturing cymbals in Quincy, Massachusetts, and the Avedis Zildjian Co. was formed the following year in 1929.

Avedis III sought out jazz drummers like Gene Krupa to understand their needs. The new cymbals he developed were widely adopted by swing and later bebop musicians, laying the foundations of the modern drum kit and playing technique.

Sales of Zildjian cymbals dramatically increased after Ringo Starr used the product in The Beatles' appearance on The Ed Sullivan Show in 1964. This created an enormous backorder situation. In 1968, in order to address this backlog, a second plant, the Azco factory, was opened in Meductic, New Brunswick, Canada.

In 1975, Zildjian began making K. Zildjian cymbals at the Azco plant. These were made until 1979. Within four years (1980), all K Cymbals were being made in the Norwell US plant, because the Ks demanded far more oversight. Armand worked with friends, the drummers Elvin Jones and Tony Williams to relaunch the K Series.

In early 1977, Armand Zildjian was appointed President of the Avedis Zildjian Company by his father. Soon after, Robert Zildjian split from the company amidst conflict with his brother, Armand. In 1981, Robert started making Sabian cymbals in the Canadian Azco factory.

Recent history
In 2002, Armand died at age 81. The Zildjian alloy recipe passed to his daughters, Craigie and Debbie (14th generation), both of whom continue to run the family business from the current headquarters in Norwell, Massachusetts.

In 2010, Zildjian acquired the Vic Firth Company and in 2018 acquired the Mike Balter Mallet company expanding the company's product offerings to include a full range of drumsticks and percussion mallets.

Notable players

At one point, more drummers and bands used Zildjian than all other big name brands combined. Musicians using or having used the brand: 

 Tim Alexander of Primus
 Rick Allen of Def Leppard
 Kenny Aronoff
 Ginger Baker of Cream
 Travis Barker of Blink-182
 Carlton Barrett of Bob Marley & The Wailers
 Carter Beauford of Dave Matthews Band
 Chuck Behler of Megadeth
 Alex Bent from Trivium
 Jason Bittner of Shadows Fall and Overkill
 Art Blakey
 Albert Bouchard of Blue Öyster Cult
 Rob Bourdon of Linkin Park
 Matt Cameron of Pearl Jam and Soundgarden
 Michael Cartellone of Lynyrd Skynyrd
 Randy Castillo of Ozzy Osbourne
 Dennis Chambers
 Will Champion of Coldplay
 Chuck Comeau of Simple Plan
 Tré Cool of Green Day
 Ejay Pichay of Gracenote
 Peter Criss of KISS
 Abe Cunningham of Deftones
 Josh Dun of Twenty One Pilots
 Phil Ehart of Kansas
 Christian Eigner of Depeche Mode
 Peter Erskine
 Zac Farro of Paramore
 Asher Fedi
 Mick Fleetwood of Fleetwood Mac (previously a Paiste user)
 Steve Gadd
 Dave Grohl of Nirvana
 Omar Hakim, session player with Sting and Dire Straits
 Mickey Hart of Grateful Dead
 Sib Hashian of Boston
 Taylor Hawkins of Foo Fighters
 Gavin Harrison of Porcupine tree
 Bryan Hitt of REO Speedwagon
 Alex Holzwarth of Rhapsody of Fire
 Ashton Irwin of  5 Seconds of Summer
 Jai Johanny "Jaimoe" Johanson of The Allman Brothers Band
 Elvin Jones
 Philly Joe Jones
 Manu Katche of Peter Gabriel
 John Keefe of Boys Like Girls
 Lee Kerslake of Uriah Heep and Ozzy Osbourne
 Joey Kramer of Aerosmith
 Bill Kreutzmann of Grateful Dead
 Gene Krupa
 Tommy Lee of Mötley Crüe (previously a Paiste user)
 Mike Mangini of Dream Theater
 Dave Mattacks of Fairport Convention
 Jason McGerr of Death Cab for Cutie
 Dewey Martin of Buffalo Springfield
 Keith Moon of The Who
 Joe Morello
 Dindin Moreno of Parokya Ni Edgar
 Andy Newmark of John Lennon and Sly and the Family Stone (previously a Paiste user)
 John Panozzo of Styx
 Simon Phillips, session player with Toto, Roger Daltrey and Judas Priest
 Jeff Plate of Trans-Siberian Orchestra
 Buddy Rich
 John Riley
 Max Roach
 Ilan Rubin of Nine Inch Nails
 Gar Samuelson of Megadeth
 Phil Selway of Radiohead
 Eric Singer of Alice Cooper and KISS
 Steve Smith of Journey
 Matt Sorum of Guns N' Roses
 Zak Starkey of Oasis and The Who
 Ringo Starr of The Beatles
 Tommy Stewart of Fuel
 Devon Taylor of Justin Bieber
 Phil Taylor of Motörhead
 Roger Taylor of Queen (previously a Paiste user)
 John Tempesta of The Cult and Testament
 Butch Trucks of The Allman Brothers Band
 Vladislav Ulasevich of Jinjer
 Lars Ulrich of Metallica
 Charlie Watts of The Rolling Stones
 Jay Weinberg of Slipknot
 Max Weinberg of Bruce Springsteen and the E Street Band
 Alan White of Yes
 Fred White of Earth, Wind & Fire
 Tony Williams
 Neil Peart of Rush

See also 
 List of oldest companies
 Sabian – Cymbal maker founded by Robert Zildjian after a family/legal dispute
 List of drum makers

Notes

References

External links

 

Companies established in 1623
Percussion instrument manufacturing companies
Cymbal manufacturing companies
Companies based in Plymouth County, Massachusetts
Companies based in Massachusetts
The Beatles' musical instruments
Musical instrument manufacturing companies of Turkey
Armenian culture
Armenian music
Norwell, Massachusetts